Wasabi (Japanese: , , or , ; Eutrema japonicum or Wasabia japonica) or Japanese horseradish is a plant of the family Brassicaceae, which also includes horseradish and mustard in other genera. The plant is native to Japan and the Russian Far East including Sakhalin, also the Korean Peninsula. It grows naturally along stream beds in mountain river valleys in Japan.

It is grown for its rhizomes which are ground into a paste as a pungent condiment for sushi and other foods. It is similar in taste to hot mustard or horseradish rather than chili peppers in that it stimulates the nose more than the tongue, but freshly grated wasabi has a subtly distinct flavor. The two main cultivars in the marketplace are E. japonicum 'Daruma' and 'Mazuma', but there are many others.

The oldest record of wasabi as a food dates to the 8th century AD. The popularity of wasabi in English-speaking countries has coincided with that of sushi, growing steadily starting in about 1980. Due to issues that limit the Japanese wasabi plant's mass cultivation and thus increase its price and decreased availability outside Japan, the western horseradish plant is generally used in place of the Japanese horseradish. This version is commonly referred to as "western wasabi" in Japan.

Taxonomy 
Siebold named Cochlearia (?) wasabi in 1830, noting its use pro condimento or "as a condiment"; however, this is a nomen nudum, and the synonym Eutrema wasabi, published by Maximovich in 1873, is thus an illegitimate name. The wasabi plant was first described by Miquel in 1866, as Lunaria (?) japonica, from the type collected by Siebold in Japan, though the precise type locality was not recorded.

In 1899, Matsumura erected the genus Wasabia, recognizing within it the species Wasabia pungens and Wasabia hederaefolia; these are now regarded as synonyms of Eutrema japonicum. In 1912, Matsumura recognized the species Wasabia japonica, treating his earlier Wasabia pungens as a synonym. In 1930, Koidzumi transferred the wasabi plant to the genus Eutrema, the correct name and author citation being Eutrema japonicum (Miq.) Koidz.

Description 
It has large leaves produced from long, thin stalks.

Wasabi flowers appear in clusters from long stems that bloom from late winter to early spring.

Uses 

Wasabi is generally sold either as a rhizome or stem, which must be very finely grated before use, as a dried powder, or as a ready-to-use paste in tubes similar to toothpaste tubes.

The part used for wasabi paste is variously characterized as a rhizome, a stem, or the "rhizome plus the base part of the stem".

In some high-end restaurants, the paste is prepared when the customer orders and is made using a grater to grate the stem; once the paste is prepared, it loses flavor in 15 minutes if left uncovered. In sushi preparation, chefs usually put the wasabi between the fish and the rice because covering wasabi until served preserves its flavor.

Fresh wasabi leaves can be eaten raw, having the spicy flavor of wasabi stems, but a common side effect is diarrhea.

Legumes (peanuts, soybeans, or peas) may be roasted or fried and then coated with wasabi powder mixed with sugar, salt, or oil and eaten as a crunchy snack. In Japan, it is called .

Surrogates

This makes fully satisfying commercial demand impossible for growers, which makes wasabi quite expensive. Therefore, outside Japan, finding real wasabi plants is rare.

A common substitute is a mixture of horseradish, mustard, starch, and green food coloring or spinach powder. Often packages are labeled as wasabi while the ingredients do not include any part of the wasabi plant. The primary difference is color, with wasabi being naturally green. Fresh horseradish root is described as having a similar (albeit simpler) flavor and texture to that of fresh wasabi.

In the United States, true wasabi is generally found only at specialty grocers and high-end restaurants.

Chemistry
The chemical in wasabi that provides for its initial pungency is the volatile compound allyl isothiocyanate, which is produced by hydrolysis of natural thioglucosides (conjugates of the sugar glucose and sulfur-containing organic compounds); the hydrolysis reaction is catalyzed by myrosinase and occurs when the enzyme is released on cell rupture caused by maceration – e.g., grating – of the plant. The same compound is responsible for the pungency of horseradish and mustard. Allyl isothiocyanate can also be released when the wasabi plants have been damaged because it is being used as a defense mechanism. The sensory neural target of mustard oil is the chemosensory receptor, TRPA1, also known as the wasabi receptor.

The unique flavor of wasabi is a result of complex chemical mixtures from the broken cells of the plant, including those resulting from the hydrolysis of thioglucosides from sinigrin into glucose and methylthioalkyl isothiocyanates:

 6-MITC
 7-Methylthioheptyl isothiocyanate
 8-Methylthiooctyl isothiocyanate

Such isothiocyanates inhibit microbial growth, perhaps with implications for preserving food against spoilage and suppressing oral bacterial growth.

Because the burning sensations of wasabi are not oil-based, they are short-lived compared to the effects of capsaicin in chili peppers and are washed away with more food or liquid. The sensation is felt primarily in the nasal passage and can be painful depending on the amount consumed. Inhaling or sniffing wasabi vapor has an effect like smelling salts, a property exploited by researchers attempting to create a smoke alarm for the deaf. One deaf subject participating in a test of the prototype awoke within 10 seconds of wasabi vapor sprayed into his sleeping chamber. The 2011 Ig Nobel Prize in Chemistry was awarded to the researchers for determining the ideal density of airborne wasabi to wake people in the event of an emergency.

Nutritional information

Wasabi is normally consumed in such small quantities that its nutritional value is negligible. The major constituents of raw wasabi root are carbohydrates (23.5%), water (69.1%), fat (0.63%), and protein (4.8%).

Cultivation

Few places are suitable for large-scale wasabi cultivation, which is difficult even in ideal conditions. In Japan, wasabi is cultivated mainly in these regions:

 Izu Peninsula in Shizuoka Prefecture ("Traditional Wasabi Cultivation in Shizuoka, Japan" is a Globally and Japanese Nationally Important Agricultural Heritage System)
 Nagano Prefecture including the Daio Wasabi Farm in Azumino (a popular tourist attraction and the world's largest commercial wasabi farm)
 Iwate Prefecture
 Shimane Prefecture known as its Hikimi wasabi

Numerous artificial cultivation facilities also exist as far north as Hokkaido and as far south as Kyushu. As the demand for real wasabi is higher than that which can be produced within Japan, Japan imports copious amounts of wasabi from the United States, Canada, Taiwan, South Korea, Israel, Thailand and New Zealand. In North America, Wasabia japonica is cultivated by a handful of small farmers and companies in the rain forests on the coast of Western Canada, the Oregon Coast, and in areas of the Blue Ridge Mountains in North Carolina and Tennessee. In Europe, wasabi is grown commercially in Iceland, the Netherlands, Hungary, and the UK.

Preparation

Wasabi is often grated with a metal oroshigane, but some prefer to use a more traditional tool made of dried sharkskin (fine skin on one side; coarse skin on the other). A hand-made grater with irregular shark teeth can also be used. If a shark-skin grater is unavailable, a ceramic cheese grater can be an acceptable substitute.

See also

 List of condiments
 List of delicacies
 Satoyama

References

Further reading

External links 

 
 
 
 
 

Eutrema
Japanese condiments
Japanese cuisine terms
Medicinal plants
Spices
Sushi
Taxa named by Gen-ichi Koidzumi